The Euroregion Pradziad (Polish) or Euroregion Praděd (Czech) is a Euroregion joining parts of the Poland and Czech Republic. It was created on 2 July 1997 in Jeseník.

The headquarters of Euroregion Praděd are Prudnik and Vrbno pod Pradědem.

The region

Constituent regions 
 : Gmina Biała, Gmina Bierawa, Gmina Byczyna, Gmina Chrząstowice, Gmina Dąbrowa, Gmina Cisek, Gmina Głogówek, Gmina Głuchołazy, Gmina Gogolin, Gmina Grodków, Gmina Izbicko, Gmina Jemielnica, Kędzierzyn-Koźle, Gmina Kolonowskie, Gmina Komprachcice, Gmina Korfantów, Gmina Krapkowice, Gmina Leśnica, Gmina Lubrza, Opole Voivodeship, Gmina Niemodlin, Gmina Nysa, Gmina Olszanka, Opole, Gmina Otmuchów, Gmina Ozimek, Gmina Paczków, Gmina Pakosławice, Gmina Pawłowiczki, Gmina Polska Cerekiew, Gmina Popielów, Gmina Prudnik, Gmina Prószków, Gmina Reńska Wieś, Gmina Rudniki, Gmina Skoroszyce, Gmina Strzeleczki, Gmina Tułowice, Gmina Ujazd, Gmina Walce, Gmina Zdzieszowice
 : Bruntál District, Jeseník District

Gallery

External links 
 Polish Euroregion website
 Czech Euroregion website

Euroregions of Poland
Geography of the Czech Republic